The Invest In Our New York Act is a proposed New York State legislative package of six bills introduced in February 2021, which would create a tax system in which wealthy people would pay a higher tax rate and apply new levies on income earned from investments in stocks. It is unlikely that they will pass as a collective unit in the 2021-2022 NYS budget.

According to a report by the coalition, the new tax code could raise as much as $12 billion to $18 billion.  This money would be spent on jobs, housing, public education, and healthcare.

The coalition believes the money would aid the recovery of the state of New York from the economic crisis caused by the COVID-19 pandemic, help close budget deficits, and rebuild New York's budget.

The legislation is backed by a coalition of over 100 different unions, community groups, and grassroots organizations, including the Democratic Socialists of America.

References

External links
Invest in Our New York

New York (state) law